The S-350 Vityaz is a Russian medium-range surface-to-air missile system developed by GSKB Almaz-Antey. Its purpose is to replace the S-300PS. The system design traces its roots from the joint South Korean/Russian KM-SAM project and uses the same 9M96 missile as the S-400 missile system.

Development
The first studies that would eventually become the S-350 started in 1999. Development began in earnest only in 2007. Almaz-Antey was able to leverage the experience gained while working on the joint development of the KM-SAM with South Korea. Around 2011, development slowed down, probably due to failed missile tests. The S-350 was unveiled in 2013, and presented at that year's MAKS airshow. Initial plans called for the system's test phase to end in the autumn of 2013, and for the delivery of around 30 systems by 2020. However, the first deliveries of the S-350 only took place in 2019, and it only entered service in February 2020.

Design
The S-350 Vityaz air defense system consists of several vehicles:
 1–2 50N6A multifunctional passively electronically scanned array radar stations. 360° coverage for early detection, target illumination and missile guidance.
 1 50K6A command post, fully autonomous combat work with interaction with other remote systems.
 4–8 50P6 launchers (12–96 missiles).
 9M96/9M96E(E2) guided missiles; passive guidance and other missiles with active homing guidance.  range, aerodynamic control surfaces and thrust vectoring.
 9M100 guided missiles;  range; infrared passive homing; aerodynamic control surfaces and thrust vectoring; maximum maneuver 60 G-20 surfaces. 9M100 can be quad packed in the naval version Resurs The Naval version of S-350 was renamed from Poliment-Redut to Resurs

Basic performance characteristics of the S-350:
Maximum number of simultaneously engaged targets:
 Aerodynamic – 16
 Ballistic – 12
Maximum number of simultaneously induced missiles – 32
Affected area for aerodynamic targets:
 Range – 
 Height – 10 m-
Affected area of ballistic targets:
 Range – 
 Height – 
Deployment time – 5 minutes

All vehicles are based on a Bryansky Avtomobilny Zavod chassis (BAZ-6909 & BAZ-69092). The naval version with 9M96E guided missile which passed state tests in 2018 is the Redut.

The export variant of the Redut was named Resurs (Resource).

Missiles

Deployment 
In September 2017, it was reported that the missile system was deployed in the town of Masyaf in Hama province, Syria, delivered from Russia via the Tartus port.

The first launches, made on March 26, 2019, were positive and the air defense missile system successfully passed state tests.

In late December 2019, at Kapustin Yar, the S-350E was officially handed over to the Russian Ministry of Defence. The handover involved tracking of aerodynamic targets.

In February 2020, the S-350 Vityaz was officially commissioned into the service of the old Russian Aerospace Defence Forces now merged in to the new Russian Aerospace Forces as the new missile system had been delivered to Zhukov Air and Space Defense Academy to train crews for the equipment.

The Almaz-Antey Group and the Defense Ministry of Russia signed contracts for the delivery of four sets of S-350 ‘Vityaz’ and three regiments of S-400 ‘Triumf’ in June 2020. Deliveries started in 2021.

Ship class that use the Redut Naval Air Defense System
 Steregushchiy-class corvette
 Gremyashchiy-class corvette
 Project 20386 corvette
 Admiral Gorshkov-class frigate

Operators

 Russian Aerospace Forces

 Algerian Land Forces

Gallery

See also
Pantsir missile system
42S6 Morfey
S-300 missile system
S-300VM missile system
S-400 missile system
S-500 missile system
KM-SAM
Barak 8

References

External links

 
 The first tests of the latest air defense system 50R6 “Vityaz” will be carried out in autumn, Russian Aviation, February 11, 2013
 Russia: Vityaz S-350 missiles create multilayered air defense | weapons defence industry military technology UK | analysis focus army defence military industry army
 
ANALYSIS | S-350E "Hero" / C-350E "Vityaz" Anti-Aircraft Missile System

Weapons of Russia
Surface-to-air missiles of Russia
Missile defense
Naval surface-to-air missiles
Almaz-Antey products
21st-century surface-to-air missiles
Military equipment introduced in the 2010s